The 2014–15 AJIHL season is the third season of the Australian Junior Ice Hockey League. It ran from 4 October 2014 until 21 February 2015, with the finals running from 28 February 2015 until 1 March 2015. The AJIHL is the highest Australian national junior ice hockey competition.

League business
The regular season began on 4 October 2014 and ran through to 21 February 2015 before the teams competed in the playoff series.

The Perth Pelicans and Perth Sharks had a game cancelled, 15 November 2014 which was never rescheduled meaning both teams finished the season a game short of the other teams.

Regular season
The regular season began on 4 October 2014 and ran through to 21 February 2015 before the teams competed in the playoff series.

October

November

January

February

March

Standings
At the end of the regular season, the league standings were as follows:

Source

Player statistics

Scoring Leaders

Leading goaltenders

Playoffs

Final

References

External links
Ice Hockey Australia
AJIHL Coverage - Hewitt Sports

AJIHL
AJIHL
AJIHL
Australian Junior Ice Hockey League